Nosratabad (also Romanized as Noşratābād; also known as Ghal’eh Jowzan, Noşratābād-e Qūzān, Qal‘eh Qowzān, Qal‘eh Qūzān, and Qal‘eh-ye Qowzān) is a village in Jowkar Rural District, Jowkar District, Malayer County, Hamadan Province, Iran. At the 2006 census, its population was 89, in 21 families.

References 

Populated places in Malayer County